John Brown Frazier (December 19, 1870 – November 11, 1939) was a United States Navy officer who served as the 1st Chief of Chaplains of the United States Navy from 1917 to 1921. In this capacity, together with Julian E. Yates of the United States Army, he edited The Army and Navy Hymnal (1920).

Frazier was born in Wytheville, Virginia in 1870. Trained as a Southern Methodist minister, he joined the Navy on March 2, 1895 in Tennessee and was commissioned in the Chaplain Corps on May 25, 1895. He continued to serve aboard the Olympia for three years, including the May 1, 1898 Battle of Manila Bay where she served as Commodore George Dewey's flagship. Frazier was reassigned to the training ship  on November 12, 1898.

Frazier was promoted to captain on June 30, 1914. As Chief of Chaplains, he supervised an increase in active-duty chaplains from 40 to 203 during World War I. After serving as Chief of Chaplains, he was assigned as chaplain for the naval training station at Hampton Roads, Virginia on December 1, 1921. Frazier retired from the Navy on September 10, 1925.

Frazier died at his home in Keswick, Virginia in 1939. He was buried in Arlington National Cemetery along with his wife Catherine Bowles Cook Frazier (February 27, 1878 – November 11, 1933).

References

1870 births
1939 deaths
People from Wytheville, Virginia
Southern Methodists
United States Navy officers
Military personnel from Tennessee
United States Navy personnel of the Spanish–American War
Chiefs of Chaplains of the United States Navy
Hymnal editors
United States Navy personnel of World War I
People from Albemarle County, Virginia
Burials at Arlington National Cemetery